José Marques (born 11 November 1967) is a Portuguese wrestler. He competed in the men's Greco-Roman 52 kg at the 1988 Summer Olympics.

References

1967 births
Living people
Portuguese male sport wrestlers
Olympic wrestlers of Portugal
Wrestlers at the 1988 Summer Olympics
Place of birth missing (living people)